Groupe Caisse d'épargne was a French cooperative banking group, with around, 4700 branches in the country. The group was active in retail and private banking, as well as holding a significant stake in the publicly traded investment bank Natixis. In 2009, it merged with Groupe Banque Populaire to form Groupe BPCE.

History

The first French savings bank was created in Paris in 1818 by a group of financiers, social reformers and philanthropists that included Benjamin Delessert, Jean-Conrad Hottinguer, Joseph Marie de Gérando, Jacques Laffitte, the Duke of La Rochefoucauld-Liancourt, James Mayer de Rothschild, and Vital Roux.

The Caisses d'Épargne were not banks, since they were not allowed to lend. The deposits they collected were invested in government bonds, from 1895 via centralized management by the Caisse des Dépôts et Consignations, a financial arm of the French state. From 1882 they competed with the Caisse Nationale d'Épargne, a state-owned entity that managed retail savings collected through the French network of post offices. By contrast with the Caisse Nationale, the local Caisses d'Épargne (also known in that context as ) were private-sector entities.

In October 2008 Groupe Caisse d'épargne announced plans to merge with fellow mutual Groupe Banque Populaire, in response to recent consolidation in the banking industry. Press agency AFP linked the announcement directly to the ongoing financial crisis of 2007–2008. The companies intend however to retain their separate retail banking brands and branch networks. If the merger is completed, the enlarged company, would hold €480 billion in deposits and have over six million customers.

Groupe Caisse d'épargne merged with the BFBP (Banque fédérale des banques populaires) in July 2009, and became BPCE, France's second-largest bank.

Operations
The group's most notable brand is the Caisse d'épargne network of mutual savings banks. Along with La Banque Postale and Crédit Mutuel, the bank shared the rights to offer the popular Livret A savings accounts, backed by the French government until January 1, 2009.

In addition, the group is also the owner of the mortgage bank Crédit Foncier, the corporate and private bank Banque Palatine and Financière Océor, a commercial, private asset management and specialist finance bank serving France's overseas departments.

In 2006 Groupe Caisse d'épargne merged its investment bank IXIS Corporate and Investment Bank with Groupe Banque Populaire's Natexis, creating Natixis, a publicly traded investment bank in which Caisse d'épargne and Groupe Banque Populaire currently hold an equal stake of 35.25%. Groupe Caisse d'épargne has also since merged its private wealth management bank La Compagnie 1818 into the Natixis group.

The group is listed in the 2007 ICA Global 300 list of mutuals and co-operatives, ranked 11th by 2005 turnover, making it the 2nd largest co-operative banking group in the world, after Crédit Agricole. It was the fourth French bank and the twenty-fifth bank in the world by total assets in 2008.

The company suffered a €751 million derivatives trading loss in October 2008, which it blamed partly on the high market volatility at the time. The group of employees responsible for making the unauthorised trades was dismissed.

Sponsorship
The group was the title sponsor of a Spanish professional cycling team from 2006 to 2010, after which Movistar took over sponsorship. 
The group is a sponsor of the French Handball Federation.

Gallery

References

External links

Groupe Caisse d'épargne official site 
Natixis official site 

Caisse d'Épargne
Banks established in 1818
1818 establishments in France
BPCE